The radiotherapy accident in Costa Rica occurred with the Alcyon II radiotherapy unit at San Juan de Dios Hospital in San José, Costa Rica. It was related to a cobalt-60 source that was being used for radiotherapy in 1996.  An accidental overexposure of radiotherapy patients treated during August and September 1996 was detected. During the calibration process done after the change of 60Co source on 22 August 1996, a mistake was made in calculating the dose rate, leading to severe overexposure of patients. The error of calibration was detected on 27 December 1997. In the course of the accident, 114 patients received an overdose of radiation and 13 died of radiation-related injuries.

In 2001, the radiophysicist whose mistake caused the radiation overdoses was charged with 16 culpable homicides and sentenced to six years in prison.

See also
 Goiânia accident
 1962 Mexico City radiation accident
 List of civilian radiation accidents
 Radiotherapy accident in Zaragoza
 X-ray
 Nuclear safety
 Nuclear whistleblowers

References

1996 in Costa Rica
Man-made disasters in Costa Rica
1996 industrial disasters
San Juan de Dios